Laura Sutton may refer to:

Laura Sutton, character in Homeland (TV series)
Laura Sutton, character in Adventures of a Private Eye
Laura Sutton, character in Riverboat (TV series)